Luciano Olguín (born March 9, 1982) is a retired Argentine footballer who played as a striker.

Club career
Olguín has previously played professional football for Racing Club and San Martín de San Juan in Argentina and Royal Antwerp F.C. in Belgium and moved to China to join Chinese Super League side Tianjin Teda on 27 July 2010.

On 24 September 2011, he suffered a depressed skull fracture during a league match against Guangzhou Evergrande, ruling him out for the rest of the season. Tianjin Teda decided not to extent his contract at the end of the 2011 league season.

Olguín signed a contract with China League One side Hohhot Dongjin in March 2012. He suffered a broken cheekbone in April 2012. Olguín played 15 league matches for Hohhot without scoring and was released at the end of the season.

Olguín signed a contract with Azerbaijan side Khazar Lankaran in February 2013. Olguín was released by Khazar at the end of the 2012–13 season. Following his release from Khazar Lanakran, Olguín signed for Argentinian Primera B Nacional side Aldosivi. On 4 July 2014, Olguín signed with the Tampa Bay Rowdies of the North American Soccer League. Olguín scored in his debut, a Fourth of July friendly against the Fort Lauderdale Strikers.

References

External links
 Luciano Olguín at BDFA.com.ar 
 Player profile on the Royal Antwerp website

1982 births
Living people
Sportspeople from Buenos Aires Province
Argentine footballers
Association football forwards
Argentine Primera División players
Challenger Pro League players
Football League (Greece) players
Chinese Super League players
North American Soccer League players
Racing Club de Avellaneda footballers
San Martín de San Juan footballers
Royal Antwerp F.C. players
K.S.K. Beveren players
Club Atlético Sarmiento footballers
Tianjin Jinmen Tiger F.C. players
Pierikos F.C. players
Tampa Bay Rowdies players
Argentine expatriate footballers
Expatriate footballers in Belgium
Expatriate footballers in Greece
Expatriate footballers in China
Expatriate soccer players in the United States
Argentine expatriate sportspeople in Azerbaijan